Carl Anton Delroy Wheatle is a British basketball player.

Professional career
During the 2019–20 LBA season he played for OriOra Pistoia.

National team career
He has been a member of the Great Britain men's national team.

External links
FIBA Profile
Profile at Eurobasket.com
Profile at Proballers.com
Profile at RealGM.com

1998 births
Living people
Basketball players from Greater London
British men's basketball players
English expatriate sportspeople in Italy
Forwards (basketball)
Pallacanestro Biella players
Pistoia Basket 2000 players